Eine Insel für zwei is the sixth German single recorded by U. S. entertainer Connie Francis.

The A-side featured a song written especially in German by Charly Niessen and Joachim Relin, who would also write Wanda Jackson's chart-topping German language debut single "Santo Domingo" in 1965.

The song on the B-Side was "Das ist zuviel", a German coverversion of Francis' U. S. Hit "Too Many Rules", which she also recorded in

French (as Faut pas faire, ça)
Italian (as Mary Lou, a. k. a. E' Mary Lou)
Japanese (as Too Many Rules [the original English title was kept])
Portuguese (as Ordens demais)
Spanish (as Tanto Control)

Eine Insel für zwei peaked at # 7 of the German charts.

References

1961 singles
Connie Francis songs
1961 songs
MGM Records singles